Bamba Qadin (died 1871; name meaning "Pink") was an Egyptian princess, and a member of the Muhammad Ali Dynasty. She is known also with the name of Umm Abbas. She was the wife of Tusun Pasha (1794–1816) the second son of Muhammad Ali Pasha and the Walida Pasha to their son Abbas Hilmi Pasha (1812–1854). According to the family documents of Rukiye Kuneralp, Bamba may have been a daughter of Mehmed Arif Bey, and sister of Fatma Zehra Hanım, wife of Muhammad Ali Pasha's son, Isma'il Pasha.

Bamba married Tusun Pasha, and gave birth to Abbas Hilmi Pasha on 1 July 1812. When Tusun died of plague at the age of twenty three in 1816, her mother-in-law Amina Hanim, took her and her son, to live with her, and refused to be parted from him.

The Sibil Kuttab Umm Abbas at Saliba Street in Cairo was built in her honor.

She died in 1871 in Ataba al-Khadra Palace, Cairo, and was buried in Qubbat Afandina, Khedive Tewfik Pasha Mausoleum, in Afifi zone.

See also
Muhammad Ali Dynasty family tree

References

Sources

External links
THROUGH MY EYES My story, my dream, my life
Foroz Realeza "MONARQUÍA y TRADICIÓN" (Monarchy and Tradition)

 Year of birth unknown
1871 deaths
Burials in Egypt
Egyptian concubines
Muhammad Ali dynasty
Egyptian princesses